The World RX of Canada is a Rallycross event held in Canada for the FIA World Rallycross Championship. The event made its debut in the 2014 season, at the Circuit Trois-Rivières in the town of Trois-Rivières, Quebec.

Past winners

References

External links

Canada
Auto races in Canada